Rhein Haus Seattle, or simply Rhein Haus, is a restaurant in Seattle, in the U.S. state of Washington. Previously, the business operated as Von Trapp's.

Description 
Rhein Haus Seattle is a German-style beer hall and restaurant in Seattle. The restaurant has a large dining area, a long bar, and mezzanines. The interior features chandeliers and reclaimed wood paneling. As of 2018 the space features 20 televisions screens, a heated patio, and bocce courts. Thrillist says: 

The menu has also included sausages such as cheddarwurst, kielbasa, and Nürnberger Rostbratwurst, as well as fried potato on a stick. The restaurant has offered free pretzels to patrons wearing lederhosen or dirndl. Rhein Haus Seattle is popular among students at nearby Seattle University, and has "sibling" restaurants in Denver (2015), Tacoma (2017), and Leavenworth.

History 
Previously known as Von Trapp's, the business was renamed in 2014. In 2022, Rhein Haus Seattle joined the Mariners Bar League. The business also hosted an LGBT pride celebration with singer Keri Hilson and drag performers Symone, Tatianna, Thorgy Thor, and Trinity K. Bonet.

Reception 
Mark Van Streefkerk included the restaurant in Eater Seattle's 2022 list of "12 Seattle Bars with Fun Activities", noting the six bocce courts.

See also 

 Food Paradise (season 17)
 List of German restaurants

References

External links 

 
 Rhein Haus Seattle at Zomato

German restaurants in Seattle